Iamonia (pronounced ) is an unincorporated community in Leon County, Florida, United States. It is located along U.S. Route 319 and the eastern terminus of County Road 12, just south of the Georgia border.

Notes

Unincorporated communities in Leon County, Florida
Unincorporated communities in Florida